Jesper Knudsen (born 22 November 1960) is a former Danish badminton player from Skovshoved club. Jesper is a two-time former Nordic champion, winner of gold medals twice in European mixed team championships alongside winning individual bronze himself in mixed doubles and champion in several tournaments of World Grand Prix. His most notable achievements include runner-up performance in 1988 All England Open.

Achievements

European  Championships

European  Junior Championships

IBF World Grand Prix 
The World Badminton Grand Prix sanctioned by International Badminton Federation (IBF) from 1983 to 2006.

IBF International

References 

1960 births
Living people
Danish male badminton players